Ottawa/Embrun Aerodrome  is a small airport located  southwest of Embrun, Ontario, Canada, east of Ottawa.

See also
 List of airports in the Ottawa area

References

Registered aerodromes in Ontario
Russell, Ontario